Kang Ga-ae (born 10 December 1990) is a South Korean footballer who plays as a goalkeeper for Sejong Sportstoto and the South Korea national team.

International career
Kang played a single match for the South Korea U20 team in 2010, a 6–2 win over Hesse in Germany. She made her full international debut on 4 June 2016 in a friendly against Myanmar, keeping a clean sheet in a 5–0 win. She did not concede a goal until her seventh cap, a 1–0 defeat to Switzerland in the 2017 Cyprus Cup.

References

External links

1990 births
Living people
South Korean women's footballers
South Korea women's international footballers
2019 FIFA Women's World Cup players
WK League players
Women's association football goalkeepers
South Korea women's under-20 international footballers